Giacconi may refer to:
 Bruno Giacconi (1889–1957), Italian sports shooter
 Riccardo Giacconi (1931–2018), Italian-American Nobel Prize-winning astrophysicist
 3371 Giacconi, an asteroid